Podrzewie  is a village in the administrative district of Gmina Duszniki, within Szamotuły County, Greater Poland Voivodeship, in west-central Poland. Buraki z Łąkowej.

References

Podrzewie